The Golden Age of Indiana Literature is a period between 1880 and 1920, when many nationally and internationally acclaimed literary works were created by natives of the state of Indiana. During this time, many of the United States' most popular authors came from Indiana. Maurice Thompson, George Ade, Booth Tarkington, Theodore Dreiser, Edward Eggleston, Frank McKinney Hubbard, George Barr McCutcheon, Meredith Nicholson, Gene Stratton Porter, Lew Wallace, and James Whitcomb Riley were foremost among the Hoosier authors.

Wallace's Ben Hur: A Tale of Christ became the best selling book of the 19th century, and Riley became the most prominent poet of the age, writing poems that included "Little Orphant Annie". Tarkington, Thompson, and Nicholson each authored several best selling novels, including The Gentleman from Indiana (Tarkington), Alice of Old Vincennes (Thompson), and The House of a Thousand Candles (Nicholson). Dreiser, an open communist, lived the longest out of the group and wrote many works of fiction and non-fiction focusing on topics of importance to society. He was unique among the group in that he was greatly disliked by citizens of his own state.

Ade, a writer, syndicated newspaper columnist, and playwright, is best known for his use of street language and slang to describe urban life in "Stories of the Streets and of the Town," his newspaper column for the Chicago Record, and his fables in slang, humorous stories that featured vernacular speech and the liberal use of capitalization. Ade's fables were published in his syndicated newspaper column, in magazines, and as a series of books, which earned him the nickname of the "Aesop of Indiana." Ade also wrote several plays produced for the Broadway stage between 1900 and 1910, including ''The County Chairman (1903) and The College Widow (1904), his best-known theatrical works, which were also adapted into motion pictures. He also wrote other film scripts and one-act plays.

Stratton-Porter was a best-selling novelist and author of nature studies, poetry, short stories, and children's books. A Girl of the Limberlost (1909) remains her best-known work. Stratton-Porter was also a columnist for national magazines such as McCall's and Good Housekeeping. Eight of her novels have been adapted into motion pictures.

The period corresponded to growth in other cultural areas including the creation of the Hoosier Group of landscape painters, and prominence of Indiana music composers like Paul Dresser. During the decades of the age, Indiana ranked second among states in the production of best selling books.

References

1880s in Indiana
1890s in Indiana
1900s in Indiana
1910s in Indiana
1920s in Indiana
1880s in literature
1890s in literature
1900s in literature
1910s in literature
1920s in literature
Indiana culture
History of Indiana
American literature by state
Indiana Literature
History of literature in the United States